The Men's team sprint competition at the 2022 UCI Track Cycling World Championships was held on 12 October 2022.

Results

Qualifying
The qualifying was started at 19:05. The best eight teams advanced to the first round.

First round
The first round was started at 20:31.

First round heats were held as follows:
Heat 1: 4th v 5th fastest
Heat 2: 3rd v 6th fastest
Heat 3: 2nd v 7th fastest
Heat 4: 1st v 8th fastest

The heat winners were ranked on time, from which the top two advanced to the gold medal race and the other two proceeded to the bronze medal race.

Finals
The first round were held at 21:26.

References

Men's team sprint